Central City is a city in Lawrence County, South Dakota, United States. The population was 93 at the 2020 census.

History
Central City was founded in 1877. It was named after Central City, Colorado, by a settler from that community. It began as a mining town during the Black Hills Gold Rush days. There was once a quarrel over mining boundaries that resulted in a deliberate explosion of the nearby Comstock Mine and the death of one man. A miners' sit-down strike occurred and a cavalry unit from Fort Meade led by Seth Bullock was called in to end it.

Geography
Central City is located at  (44.367211, -103.769652).

Climate

Demographics

2010 census
As of the census of 2010, there were 134 people, 66 households, and 37 families living in the city. The racial makeup of the city was 94.0% White, 1.5% Native American, 0.7% from other races, and 3.7% from two or more races. Hispanic or Latino of any race were 0.7% of the population.

There were 66 households, of which 18.2% had children under the age of 18 living with them, 34.8% were married couples living together, 12.1% had a female householder with no husband present, 9.1% had a male householder with no wife present, and 43.9% were non-families. 33.3% of all households were made up of individuals, and 9.1% had someone living alone who was 65 years of age or older. The average household size was 2.03 and the average family size was 2.41.

The median age in the city was 48.7 years. 11.9% of residents were under the age of 18; 5.9% were between the ages of 18 and 24; 23.2% were from 25 to 44; 45.6% were from 45 to 64; and 13.4% were 65 years of age or older. The gender makeup of the city was 47.8% male and 52.2% female.

2000 census
As of the census of 2000, there were 149 people, 67 households, and 39 families living in the city. The population density was 1,033.0 people per square mile (410.9/km2). There were 76 housing units at an average density of 526.9 per square mile (209.6/km2). The racial makeup of the city was 99.33% White and 0.67% Asian.

There were 67 households, out of which 19.4% had children under the age of 18 living with them, 53.7% were married couples living together, 4.5% had a female householder with no husband present, and 40.3% were non-families. 32.8% of all households were made up of individuals, and 7.5% had someone living alone who was 65 years of age or older. The average household size was 2.22 and the average family size was 2.80.

In the city, the population was spread out, with 19.5% under the age of 18, 5.4% from 18 to 24, 33.6% from 25 to 44, 33.6% from 45 to 64, and 8.1% who were 65 years of age or older. The median age was 43 years. For every 100 females, there were 112.9 males. For every 100 females age 18 and over, there were 118.2 males.

The median income for a household in the city was $21,250, and the median income for a family was $31,250. Males had a median income of $23,750 versus $18,438 for females. The per capita income for the city was $12,870. There were 10.5% of families and 15.9% of the population living below the poverty line, including 17.4% of under eighteens and 21.4% of those over 64.

References

External links

Cities in South Dakota
Cities in Lawrence County, South Dakota
Mining communities in South Dakota